Governor Hubbard may refer to:

Henry Hubbard (1784–1857), Governor of New Hampshire
John Hubbard (Maine politician) (1794–1869), Governor of Maine
Lucius Frederick Hubbard (1836–1913), Governor of Minnesota
Richard B. Hubbard (1832–1901), Governor of Texas
Richard D. Hubbard (1818–1884), Governor of Connecticut